Orton Park is located in Madison, Wisconsin.

History
The land was previously designated as a public cemetery. In 1877, the graves located at the site were moved to Forest Hill Cemetery. The site was officially opened as a park in 1887 and was named after Harlow S. Orton. It is located within the Orton Park Historic District.

References

Parks on the National Register of Historic Places in Wisconsin
National Register of Historic Places in Madison, Wisconsin
Geography of Madison, Wisconsin